George Bermann is an American lawyer and scholar of international law. He is the Walter Gelhorn Professor of Law, the Jean Monnet Professor of European Union Law, the Director of the Center for International Commercial and Investment Arbitration Law, and the Co-Director of the European Legal Studies Center at Columbia Law School, as well as a permanent faculty member of the Institut d'Études Politiques (Sciences Po) in Paris, France, and the Collège d'Europe in Bruges, Belgium. Previously, he held the Tocqueville-Fulbright Distinguished Professorship at the University of Paris I (Panthéon-Sorbonne).

Education and family
George Bermann earned his B.A. summa cum laude from Yale College in 1967, studied at the University of Sussex on a Marshall Scholarship from 1967 to 1968, and received his J.D. from Yale Law School in 1971, where he was an editor of the Yale Law Journal. Bermann earned his LL.M. from Columbia Law School. After working at Davis Polk & Wardwell for four years, he joined Columbia Law School's faculty in 1975. He is married to Sandra Bermann, the Cotsen Professor of the Humanities at Princeton University.

Bermann is married to Sandra Bermann.

Academic career
Bermann is an expert in comparative law and private international law. His writing has been cited by foreign courts, as well as domestic state and federal courts. He is the past President of the American Society of Comparative Law, the past editor-in-chief of the American Journal of Comparative Law, and the current President of the International Academy of Comparative Law. He is also the Chief Reporter of the ALI's Restatement of the Law of International Commercial and Investor–State Arbitration and co-editor in chief of the American Review of International Arbitration.

Bermann has testified before Congress on several occasions, including before the Senate Judiciary Committee on the OPEC countries and sovereign immunity (2004), the House Committee on Foreign Affairs on Colombian practice in international arbitration and Andean legislation benefits (2002), and the House Committee on Government Operations on tort liability of federal public officials (1983). He has also advised the National People's Congress of China on government liability and the UK Select Committee of the House of Lords on the ratification of the draft European Union Constitution.

In 2010, he was commissioned by the Iraqi Ministry of Oil and the U.S. Department of Commerce to train Iraqi jurists as part of efforts to rebuild Iraq's legal system following Operation Iraqi Freedom.

Private practice
Bermann is rated one of the top international arbitration lawyers in the United States (Band 1) by Chambers and Partners. In the 1990s and 2000s, he represented Argentinian oil company Bridas in its successful $1.23 billion claim against Turkmenistan.

Honorary degrees and board memberships
Bermann has received honorary degrees from the University of Fribourg (2000), the University of Versailles (2011) and the Universidade Nova de Lisboa (2019). In 2001, he was conferred a Jean Monnet Chair by the Commission of the European Union. He is a director of the American Arbitration Association, and he and his wife serve on the Board of Overseers of Koç Holding. He is currently a member of the Whitney R. Harris World Law Institute's International Council.

References

1945 births
Yale Law School alumni
Columbia Law School alumni
Columbia Law School faculty
Academic staff of the College of Europe
Living people
Davis Polk & Wardwell lawyers
Yale College alumni